Marie-Noëlle Lienemann (born 12 July 1951, in Belfort) is a French politician who served as Member of the European Parliament for the North West of France. Until 2018, she was a member of the Socialist Party, part of the Party of European Socialists. She studied chemistry at the École Normale Supérieure de Cachan (ENS Cachan).

Lienemann was part of the European Parliament's delegation to the 2008 United Nations Climate Change Conference in Poznań, Poland.

In 2012, Lienemann co-founded the "Now The Left" grouping alongside Emmanuel Maurel. Together they urged President François Hollande to abandon the government's 2013 deficit targets and embark on a dash for growth. Following the Socialist Party's losses in the 2014 municipal elections, Lienemann and Maurel co-authored an open letter addressed to Hollande, calling on him to return to Socialist basics, end a freeze on public sector salaries, and raise the minimum salary and pensions.

In October 2018, she and Maurel left the Socialist Party and founded the left-wing Alternative for a Republican, Ecologist and Socialist Program (APRÉS). It merged with Jean-Pierre Chevènement's Citizen and Republican Movement in February 2019 to form the Republican and Socialist Left (GRS).

References

1951 births
Living people
Politicians from Belfort
French people of German descent
Republican and Socialist Left politicians
Women government ministers of France
Senators of Paris
MEPs for North-West France 2004–2009
21st-century women MEPs for France
Socialist Party (France) MEPs
Women mayors of places in France
Women members of the Senate (France)